Adalbert Gurath may refer to:

 Adalbert Gurath, Sr. (born 1915), fencer who represented Romania at the 1952 Summer Olympics
 Adalbert Gurath, Jr. (born 1942), son of above, who fenced for Romania at the 1960 Summer Olympics